Cheryl Najafi (born 1967/1968) is an American author, speaker and businesswoman. She is the former CEO of Everyday Dishes & DIY (previously CherylStyle), a lifestyle media company and author of New York Times best-selling book "You're So Invited: Panic Less, Play More, and Get Your Party On!". In 2017, Najafi founded the direct-to-consumer apparel company, LoveOverH8.com, after seeing the effects of the Trump travel ban.

Early life and education
Najafi was born in Webb City, Missouri. She earned both a Bachelor's and Master's degree in communication from Arizona State University.

Career
In January 2011, Najafi founded CherylStyle, a multimedia lifestyle company based in Arizona. She was the founding CEO of the company. CherylStyle was later rebranded as Everyday Dishes & DIY.

In 2012, Najafi wroteYou're So Invited: Panic Less, Play More, and Get Your Party On which was a New York Times best-selling book in June 2012. The book gives tips on entertaining and etiquette while focusing on using what you have and maintaining that it is not necessary to be perfect. Najafi wrote her second book, Mother Daughter Dishes: Reinventing Loved Classics in 2014.

After the announcement of President Donald Trump's travel ban, Najafi searched online to find clothing that matched her views of inclusivity. She started LoveOverH8.com, a direct-to-consumer apparel company that advocates for social justice causes. Najafi instituted that $10 of each sale goes toward a cause of the customer's choice to raise money for people that have been disenfranchised.

Personal life
She is married to businessman Jahm Najafi. They have a son and daughter who are twins, and another daughter. Najafi and her family live in Phoenix, Arizona.

Bibliography

References

Year of birth missing (living people)
Living people
American women chief executives
American women writers
Arizona State University alumni
21st-century American women
1960s births